Arrmanatha Christiawan Nasir (born 30 December 1971) is an Indonesian diplomat who assumed his role as Ambassador of the Republic of Indonesia to the United Nations and the International Seabed Authority in New York, following his appointment by President Joko Widodo on 25 October 2021. Nasir was previously the Ambassador of the Republic of Indonesia to the French Republic, Principality of Andorra, Principality of Monaco, and the United Nations Educational, Scientific, and Cultural Organisation (UNESCO) from 2019 to 2021.

Early life
Arrmanatha Christiawan Nasir, who goes by his nickname "Tata", was born in Bangkok, Thailand. He grew up in the United Kingdom where he completed his GCSE and A Levels at Whitefield School in London in 1989. In 1993, Nasir graduated from the University of Buckingham with a Bachelor’s Degree in Economics. He later obtained his Master’s Degree in Business Administration (MBA) from Leicester University in 1994, and Master’s Degree in International Relations from the University of Indonesia in 2000.

Career
Prior to his career as a diplomat, Nasir had worked in banking, as an account executive for Bank Danamon (1995–1996) and in correspondent banking for Bank Dagang Negara (1996–1997). Nasir joined the Ministry of Foreign Affairs of the Republic of Indonesia in 1997, where he headed the Desk for Operational Activities of UN Economic and Social Bodies at the Directorate General of Economic Multilateral Affairs until 2001.

United Nations, Geneva (2001–2005)
His first diplomatic posting was from 2001 to 2005, as Second Secretary at the Permanent Mission of the Republic of Indonesia to the United Nations in Geneva. He was a negotiator for Indonesia at the World Trade Organization for Trade in Agriculture, Trade-Related Aspects of Intellectual Property Rights (TRIPs), and Trade and Environment during the WTO Doha Development Agenda trade round.

In 2005, he resumed his career at the Directorate General of Multilateral Affairs at the Ministry of Foreign Affairs, as Deputy Director for Agriculture and Commodities until 2008, in which he was concurrently the Secretary for the National Task Force of the G33.

United Nations, New York (2008–2012)
Nasir was assigned to the Permanent Mission of the Republic of Indonesia to the United Nations in New York as First Secretary from 2008 to 2012, responsible for economics and development issues at the United Nations General Assembly and ECOSOC. During this assignment, he was also seconded to the Office of the President of the United Nations General Assembly, as Economic Advisor during the 65th session of the UN General Assembly.

Spokesperson for the Ministry of Foreign Affairs (2014–2019)
Nasir was appointed the Spokesperson and Head of the Office of the Minister for Foreign Affairs of the Republic of Indonesia from December 2014 to January 2019, after heading the Economic Finance and Development Department at the Office of the Minister for Foreign Affairs from 2012.

Ambassador to France, Andorra, Monaco, and the UNESCO (2019–2021)

On 7 January 2019, Nasir was appointed as Indonesian Ambassador to France, Andorra, Monaco, and the UNESCO by President Joko Widodo, and presented his credentials to President Emmanuel Macron on 12 April 2019. On 17 November 2021, he was awarded the Commander of the Legion of Honour by the French government for his contribution in "promoting political, socio-cultural, and economic cooperation between Indonesia and France".

Ambassador to the United Nations and the International Seabed Authority (2021–)
On 25 October 2021, Nasir was appointed by President Joko Widodo as Ambassador to the United Nations and the International Seabed Authority, and became the first Indonesian Permanent Representative to the latter.

Personal life
Nasir has been married to Nur Indah Sari since 2001. The pair has two sons and a daughter.

Honors

Foreign honors
:
 Commander of the Legion of Honour (2021)

References

1971 births
Living people
Indonesian diplomats
Permanent Delegates of Indonesia to UNESCO
Permanent Representatives of Indonesia to the United Nations
Ambassadors of Indonesia to France
Ambassadors of Indonesia to Monaco
Ambassadors of Indonesia to Andorra